WEBQ-FM (102.3 MHz) is a radio station licensed to Eldorado, Illinois, United States. The station airs a soft adult contemporary format, and is owned by Dana Withers' Withers Broadcasting, through licensee WEBQ, LLC.

On January 1, 2023, WEBQ-FM rebranded as "102.3 Lite FM".

References

External links
WEBQ-FM's website

EBQ-FM
Soft adult contemporary radio stations in the United States
Radio stations established in 1972
1972 establishments in Illinois